Alexander Alexandrovich Murski (Russian: Александр Александрович Мурский) (1 November 1869 – April 1943) was a Saint Petersburg, Russian-born German actor. Murski died in 1943 in  Toulouse, Midi-Pyrénées, France.

He was occasionally credited with the names Alexander Mursky and Aleksandr Murskij.

Selected filmography
 Zaida, the Tragedy of a Model (1923)
 Michael (1924)
 Comedy of the Heart (1924)
 Two Children (1924)
 The Blackguard (1925)
 The Adventure of Mr. Philip Collins (1925)
 The Telephone Operator (1925)
 The Island of Dreams (1925)
 The Found Bride (1925)
 Love is Blind (1926)
 State Attorney Jordan (1926)
 The Son of Hannibal (1926)
 His Toughest Case (1926)
 Mata Hari (1927)
 A Murderous Girl (1927)
 The Queen of Spades (1927)
 Homesick (1927)
 The False Prince (1927)
 The Famous Woman (1927)
 Linden Lady on the Rhine (1927)
 Luther (1928)
 Rasputins Liebesabenteuer (1928)
 The Republic of Flappers (1928)
 Parisiennes (1928)
 Sajenko the Soviet (1928)
 Two Red Roses (1928)
 Life's Circus (1928)
 Eva in Silk (1928)
 Hungarian Nights (1929)
 Fräulein Else (1929)
 The Man with the Frog (1929)
 The Circus Princess (1929)
 His Majesty's Lieutenant (1929)
 The Hound of the Baskervilles (1929)
 The Man Without Love (1929)
 The White Devil (1930)
 Cyanide (1930)
 You'll Be in My Heart (1930)
 Chasing Fortune (1930)
 Johann Strauss (1931)
 Everyone Asks for Erika (1931)
 The Case of Colonel Redl (1931)
 In the Employ of the Secret Service (1931)
 The Unfaithful Eckehart (1931)
 Rasputin, Demon with Women (1932)
 A Thousand for One Night (1933)

Bibliography
 Bordwell, David. The Films of Carl Theodor Dreyer. University of California Press, 1992.
 Eisner, Lotte H. The Haunted Screen: Expressionism in the German Cinema and the Influence of Max Reinhardt. University of California Press, 2008.

External links

1869 births
1943 deaths
German male film actors
German male silent film actors
Russian male film actors
Russian male silent film actors
20th-century German male actors
Male actors from Saint Petersburg